ABCya.com, L.L.C. (also stylized as ABCya!) is a website that provides educational games and activities for school-aged children. The games on the website are organized into grade levels from pre-kindergarten to Sixth grade, as well as into subject categories such as letters, numbers, and holidays. Many of the games meet standards associated with the Common Core State Standards Initiative.

History

ABCya.com was founded in 2004 by Alan Tortolani. A public school teacher, Tortolani created his own activities for his students. Later, he decided to register a domain under ABCya.com. Tortolani chose this particular domain name “ABCya” to make it accessible to children and easy to type into a web browser.

In April 2017, Lisa Tortolani took over as Chief Executive Officer.

The company was acquired by IXL Learning in 2018.

When Flash was discontinued, many of the website's games were made unplayable. Some games were remade in JavaScript while others were taken off the site entirely, both cases leading to lost media.

Awards
ABCya.com has won a Parents’ Choice Award- Spring 2014 Websites 
ABCya! Animate app has won a Parents’ Choice Silver Honor- Spring 2014 Mobile Apps

References

American educational websites
Education companies established in 2004
American children's websites